The 2019 Ohio Valley Conference men's basketball tournament was the final event of the 2018–19 season in the Ohio Valley Conference. The tournament was held March 6 through March 9, 2019 at the Ford Center in Evansville, Indiana.

The final featured the regular-season co-champions in Belmont and Murray State, with Murray State winning 77–65 and thus earning the conference's automatic bid to the NCAA tournament.

Seeds
Only the top eight teams in the conference qualified for the tournament. Teams are seeded by record within the conference, with a tiebreaker system to seed teams with identical conference records. The No. 1 and No. 2 seeds receive double byes to the semifinals. The No. 3 and No. 4 seeds receive a single bye to the quarterfinals.

Schedule

Bracket

References

Ohio Valley Conference men's basketball tournament
Basketball competitions in Evansville, Indiana
Tournament
Ohio Valley Conference men's basketball tournament
Ohio Valley Conference men's basketball tournament
College basketball tournaments in Indiana